Thokozani Sekotlong (born 7 May 1991) is a South African professional soccer player who plays as a midfielder for South African Premier Division side Chippa United.

Early life
Sekotlong was born in Mamelodi.

Club career
Sekotlong started his career at University of Pretoria, and was part of the team that reached the final of the 2008–09 Nedbank Cup, before losing to Moroka Swallows. He won promotion with the club to the South African Premier Division in 2012. He rejected offers from Kaizer Chiefs and Platinum Stars that summer, and played 13 times for AmaTuks in the league across the 2012–13 season. He was released bu AmaTuks in 2013, and subsequently joined Maritzburg United. He appeared in 36 league matches, scoring 6 goals, over a two-year spell with the club, before being released in the summer of 2015.

After a spell with National First Division side Cape Town All Stars in the latter half of the 2015–16 season, he joined Free State Stars in the summer of 2016. He left the club at the end of the season.

He joined Mamelodi Sundowns in the summer of 2017. He scored his first goal for the club on 21 October 2017 in a 2–1 defeat at home to AmaZulu. He joined Black Leopards on loan in January 2019. He left Sundowns at the end of the 2018–19 season.

Having been without a club since his release from Mamelodi Sundowns at the end of the previous season, he joined Chippa United in January 2020. He scored his first goal for the club on 28 August 2020: a late equaliser in a 1–1 draw with Stellenbosch.

International career
Sekotlong was called up to the South Africa under-23 squad in 2011.

References

Living people
1991 births
People from Mamelodi
Sportspeople from Gauteng
South African soccer players
Association football midfielders
University of Pretoria F.C. players
Maritzburg United F.C. players
Cape Town All Stars players
Free State Stars F.C. players
Mamelodi Sundowns F.C. players
Black Leopards F.C. players
Chippa United F.C. players
South African Premier Division players
National First Division players